Grange Park is a neighbourhood in downtown Toronto, Ontario, Canada. It is bounded on the west by Spadina Avenue, on the north by College Street, on the east by University Avenue and on the south by Queen Street West. It is within the 'Kensington-Chinatown' planning neighbourhood of the City of Toronto. Its name is derived from the Grange Park public park. The commercial businesses of Chinatown extend within this neighbourhood.

History
Grange Park was initially an elite neighbourhood, with mansions lining Beverley Street. The neighbourhood took its name from The Grange, a mansion built in 1817 by G. D'Arcy Boulton, Auditor-General of Upper Canada and a member of the prominent Boulton family. The Grange is the oldest standing brick house in Toronto. It served as the first home of OCAD University, and today forms a wing of the Art Gallery of Ontario. Prominent early residents of the neighbourhood included George Brown, a Father of Confederation and founder of The Globe newspaper (186 Beverley Street) and the family of William Lyon Mackenzie King, Canada's longest serving Prime Minister (147 Beverley Street).

The area was transformed into a working class, immigrant community by 1900 with rows of workers' cottages. Many of the more prominent brick row houses, built in the Edwardian style, still survive in the neighbourhood today. By 1914, the area had become predominantly Jewish as Eastern European Jewish immigrants left The Ward and moved west of University Avenue towards Spadina Avenue.  Synagogues and other community institutions were located on McCaul, Beverley and Cecil streets.  Among the more famous Jewish residents was the family of architect Frank Gehry, whose grandparents owned a rowhouse at 15 Beverley Street. Gehry later recalled that his first exposure to art came at the Art Gallery of Ontario, for which he was later commissioned to design renovation completed in 2008.

By the 1960s, the Jewish community had given way to the Chinese community following the demolition of Toronto's original Chinatown to build the new City Hall, which migrated westward along Dundas Street to form the present-day Chinatown centered at Dundas and Spadina.

At the heart of the Neighbourhood lies Grange Park itself. The park was created in 1911, when Harriett Boulton gifted her family property to be home for a new Art Museum of Toronto (later evolving into the Art Gallery of Ontario). Upkeep of the expansive gardens to the south of Grange House was entrusted to the City of Toronto, which has maintained the lands as a public park ever since.

In 1852 a fall fair held by the Provincial Agricultural Association of Canada West took place just west of University Avenue from north of Dundas Street to south of College Street. The fair was mainly displaying animals (dairy cattle, sheep, horses), but also a refreshment area, floral hall and a midway (pleasure grounds). This was the second time for Toronto hosting, a fair that would be replaced by the Canadian National Exhibition in 1879.

Character

Grange Park is a mixed, but predominantly residential neighbourhood. The residential stock varies from working men's cottages built in the 1800s to semi-detached homes to mansions. Many of the buildings have been converted to commercial use, including art galleries within the vicinity of the Art Gallery of Ontario, restaurants and offices. Many of the homes are rented to students of the Ontario College of Art & Design, located on McCaul Street, and the University of Toronto, located to the north.

In the western section, the businesses of Chinatown extend east from Spadina along Dundas to nearly Beverley, while the side streets have remained residential. The eastern section, along University Avenue, is predominantly institutional buildings facing on University Avenue. The buildings are higher than the neighbourhood and more recently built, and have expanded westward into the neighbourhood. Beverley Street north of Dundas has several century-old mansions on both sides of the street, some converted from residential to office uses, and others converted to multi-unit buildings.

East-west, the main street of the neighbourhood is Dundas Street, a street of commercial buildings. North-south, the main streets are Beverly Street and McCaul Street. A commercial enclave has developed around Baldwin Avenue between Beverley and McCaul Streets named 'Baldwin Village' of converted residences housing restaurants of numerous cuisines, and stores of arts, gifts and curios. The residences of the north side of Dundas Street between Beverley and McCaul (across from the AGO) have all been converted to art galleries.

The homes of the east side of McCaul Street from Dundas south were demolished and the Village by The Grange residential and commercial complex was built. When it was built in 1980, it was a rare example in Toronto of a low-rise apartment complex with mixed commercial uses being built after several decades of high-rise apartment building construction in the downtown core.

Landmarks
 Art Gallery of Ontario - 317 Dundas Street West
 OCAD University - 100 McCaul Street
 The Grange - mansion, and original home of Art Gallery of Ontario
 George Brown House - home of the publisher, politician, and Father of Confederation George Brown - 186 Beverley Street
 Consulate General of Italy - 136 Beverley Street
 Village by the Grange - shopping and residential complex on the east side of McCaul Street.

Transportation

On the east, three subway stations on the Yonge-University-Spadina subway line stop at College Street (Queen's Park), Dundas Street (St. Patrick and Queen Street (Osgoode). There are streetcar lines on College, Dundas, Queen and Spadina, the Spadina line connecting to the Spadina station on the Bloor-Danforth subway line.

Demographics

Census tracts 0036.00 and 0037.00 of the 2006 Canadian census cover Grange Park. According to that census, the neighbourhood has 9,007 residents. Average income is $35,277, slightly below the Toronto average. The ten most common languages spoken at home, after English, are:

Unspecified Chinese - 14.8%
Cantonese - 10.0%
Mandarin - 4.6%
Vietnamese - 1.9%
French - 0.8%
Korean - 0.4%
Tagalog - 0.4%
Punjabi - 0.4%
Hebrew - 0.3%
Persian - 0.2%

For Census Tract 5350036.00

According to Statistics Canada, in 2006 the neighbourhood had 4,505 residents. In 2011, this rose by 410 persons to 4915 persons. (Statistics Canada 2006, 2011)

Data on East Asian Ethnic Origin for 2006 and 2011

2006 Percentage Distribution of East Asian Population Origin

Source: Statistics Canada 2006
Note: Percentages calculated up to one decimal place.

2011 Percentage Distribution of East Asian Population Origin - CT 5350036.00

Source: Statistics Canada 2011
GNR: 27.5% 
Note: Percentages calculated up to one decimal point.

Those identifying as having East Asian origin (Chinese, Filipino, Vietnamese, Japanese and Korean), had increased from 42.1% (1895/4505) of the total population to 44.6% (2190/4915) of the total population between 2006 and 2011. Only those identifying with Japanese Ethnic Origin saw a decrease in population between 2006 and 2011.

References

External links
 Grange Park on TorontoNeighbourhoods.com

Neighbourhoods in Toronto
Chinatowns in Canada